Vindholmen is a small islet southeast of Brækmoholmane, part of Thousand Islands, an island group south of Edgeøya.

References 

 Norwegian Polar Institute Place Names of Svalbard Database

Islands of Svalbard